Dawangqiao, or Dawang Bridge, is the starting point of the Jingtong Expressway, an express route linking central Beijing to Tongzhou District approximately 15 kilometres to the east.

Dawangqiao is halfway between Dabeiyao/Guomao on the eastern 3rd Ring Road and Sihui Bridge on the eastern 4th Ring Road, close to the new Beijing central business district.

The area is served by Dawanglu Station, on Line 1 of the Beijing Subway system.

Road transport in Beijing